is a Japanese retired professional wrestler, wrestling instructor and commentator who is known for his work in New Japan Pro-Wrestling (NJPW), and shoot-style promotions Universal Wrestling Federation (UWF) and UWF International (UWFi). He currently works as a commentator for New Japan Pro-Wrestling (NJPW).

Professional wrestling career

New Japan Pro-Wrestling (1982–1984)
An amateur wrestler and high school judoka in his youth, Yamazaki's professional wrestling career began in May 1982 in New Japan Pro-Wrestling. He wrestled his debut match on May 6 against Kuroneko. During this time, he was also a student of Satoru Sayama, better known as Tiger Mask, who trained Yamazaki in shoot wrestling and kickboxing. Whenever Kuniaki Kobayashi stripped Sayama of his mask, Yamazaki was always the first to help remask him.

Universal Wrestling Federation (1984–1985)
In 1984, Yamazaki joined the shoot style promotion Japanese UWF, an early precursor to modern mixed martial arts. However, differences between his mentor Satoru Sayama and Akira Maeda over direction caused the promotion to fail.

Return To NJPW (1985–1988)
He rejoined New Japan in 1985 as a junior heavyweight. Despite this, he found more success in tag teams in 1987, winning the IWGP Tag Team Championship with one of his mentors, Yoshiaki Fujiwara.

Newborn UWF (1988–1990)
In 1988, however, the UWF was reconstituted as Newborn UWF and Yamazaki joined it, and stayed there until it folded in December 1990.

UWF International (1991–1995)
In May 1991, Yamazaki joined UWF International. In UWF International, he supported Nobuhiko Takada, but after being overlooked several times for shots at Takada's UWFI World Heavyweight championship, he decided to quit and return to New Japan on his own in July 1995.

Return To NJPW (1995–2000)
During the New Japan vs. UWFI feud in 1995-1996, Yamazaki participated on New Japan's side, but mostly as a behind-the-scenes supporter, training Yuji Nagata and Tokimitsu Ishizawa (Kendo Ka Shin) in the use of the shoot-style. He won two more IWGP Tag Team Championships, first with Takashi Iizuka in June 1996 and with Kensuke Sasaki in August 1997. In 1998, he participated in the G1 Climax tournament, defeating Tatsumi Fujinami, Kensuke Sasaki, and Masahiro Chono, before losing to Shinya Hashimoto in the finals. Yamazaki retired from in-ring competition on January 4, 2000, losing to his student Yuji Nagata as his final opponent.

Retirement
Kazuo Yamazaki now works as a wrestling instructor at the NJPW Dojo and sometimes acts as color commentator for the NJPW program on TV Asahi. He also works as a seitaishi in Ayase, Kanagawa.

Championships and accomplishments
New Japan Pro-Wrestling
IWGP Tag Team Championship (3 times) – with Yoshiaki Fujiwara (1), Takashi Iizuka (1), and Kensuke Sasaki (1)
G1 Climax Special Tag Team Tournament (1997) – with Kensuke Sasaki
Pro Wrestling Illustrated
PWI ranked him #92 of the 500 best singles wrestlers of the year in the PWI 500 in 1997
PWI ranked him #310 of the Top 500 Singles Wrestlers of the "PWI Years" in 2003
Universal Wrestling Federation
Kakuto Nettai Road "B" League Tournament (1985)

Notes

External links

1962 births
20th-century professional wrestlers
Japanese male professional wrestlers
Professional wrestling trainers
Japanese catch wrestlers
Living people
Sportspeople from Tokyo
People from Ayase, Kanagawa
Sportspeople from Kanagawa Prefecture
IWGP Heavyweight Tag Team Champions